Sırıklı is a village in the Bekilli District of Denizli Province in Turkey.

References

Villages in Bekilli District